Grasshopper is an app developed by Google that teaches users to code with JavaScript. Available for IOS and Android operating systems, the program aims to teach with small "bite-size" coding lessons. The program gets harder as it progresses, and upon finishing the program, the user will get a certificate of completion. Assessments are not required to gain the certificate of completion.

In March 2023, Google announced that Grasshopper would shut down on June 15.

References

External links 
 

Android (operating system) software
Google services
Google software
IOS software
Mobile software